Death By Diet is a board game published in 1989 by Lombard Marketing.

Contents
Death By Diet is a game in which a 500-piece jigsaw puzzle with elements of detective fiction as a short story, where the puzzle shows the scene of the crime and clues to the identity of the murderer.

The game was offered on the back of Total cereal boxes.

Reception
John Harrington reviewed Death By Diet for Games International magazine, and gave it 2 stars out of 5, and stated that "The BePUZZLED concept promises more than it delivers. I was expecting the story to provide clues that would help me complete the puzzle, rather than a puzzle that would help me make sense of the story."

References

Board games introduced in 1989